Nick Cooney (23 July 1934 – 2 March 1999) was an Irish sports shooter. He competed in the mixed skeet event at the 1980 Summer Olympics. In 1986, he and his brother founded the Tipperary Natural Mineral Water company.

References

External links
 

1934 births
1999 deaths
Irish male sport shooters
Olympic shooters of Ireland
Shooters at the 1980 Summer Olympics
Place of birth missing
20th-century Irish people